A thirteenth salary, or end-of-year bonus, is an extra payment given to employees at the end of December. Although the amount of the payment depends on a number of factors, it usually matches an employee's monthly salary and can be paid in one or more installments (depending on country).

History 
In Italy it was originally named 'gratifica natalizia' ("Christmas bonus") being a voluntary donation without any obligation that the employer recognized to its employees when entering the Christmastide and was legalized in the 1937 collective labour agreement for factory labour and was extended to all kind of works in 1946 and by presidential decree in 1960.

In the Philippines it was legalized in December 1975 responding the problem of update the minimum wage. The minimum wage had not been raised for five years, and no longer matched the cost of living. President Ferdinand Marcos issued Presidential Decree No. 851 (at this time Marcos ruled by decree without a legislature), ordering employers to pay a thirteenth salary to improve the situation to employees who are earning less than 1,000 pesos per month, at that time a princely sum. The decree notably excluded employees of the government and its instruments. With the removal of Marcos, his successor Corazon Aquino removed the 1,000 limit in 1986, giving the privilege to all private sector employees. Two years later, Aquino signed Republic Act No. 6686, extending the privilege to government employees.

Compensation based on annual work was paid in addition to the basic salary on the basis of the decision of the Central Committee of the Communist Party of the Soviet Union and the Council of Ministers of the USSR on 4 October 1965 ("On improving planning and enhancing economic incentives for industrial production"). Paid from the material incentive fund, the amount of funds was determined by the administration in conjunction with the Central Committee. If a company fulfilled (or exceeded) annual plans for the sale of products (or profits) and estimated profitability, the thirteenth salary could be paid from funds earmarked in the budget and other cash reserves. If a company did not meet the targets, a reduced amount was paid.

In Switzerland , the 13th month salary began to impose itself at the end of the 1960’s, even if it started to spread before. Conflicts took place concerning the time schedule of payment, as workers wanted regular payments and employers were more comfortable with yearly or half-yearly payments. 
Many firms, like the Swiss Broadcasting Corporation decided to implement the 13th month salary to appear more attractive to skilled candidates.

In Mauritius, the 13th month salary was implemented in December 1975, but many battles took place to achieve this goal. Every trade union centres, like the Federation of Civil Service Unions, had to fight together, using street campaigns and work stoppages. Around the 1970’s, the price of sugar skyrocketed and yet some of the companies in the sugar industry did not want to pay a 13th month salary or bonus to its employees. From 1973 and onwards, under the pressure of the Sugar Industry Staff Employees Association (SISEA), a group of executives had to sign an agreement stating that a 13th month salary or bonus will be paid based on the yearly profits. 
However, for every other industry that the sugar industry, workers at that time could not benefit from a 13th month salary. Therefore, more protests in the streets happened. In 1975, with the help of Cyril Canabady, a lawyer, the government finally stated that every employer would have to pay a 13th month salary.

Details 
A number of countries followed the Philippines, enacting similar thirteenth-salary laws, and some have passed laws about fourteenth- and fifteenth-month pay. Some regions have a compulsory fourteenth salary. Brazil has a mandatory fourteenth-month salary, which is treated as a holiday bonus.

The payment varies by country. Some have one payment at the end of the year, and others pay in two installments: one in the first half of the year and the other at the end of the year. This could motivate people to travel or otherwise enjoy summer holidays. Corporations that fail to make the payments may be fined.

Taxation 
The thirteenth salary is normally tax-exempt, although some countries have restrictions; if the payment exceeds one month's salary, it could be taxable.

Computation 
The thirteenth salary is most frequently expressed as a one month's salary, or one-twelfth of the annual salary. Not all workers are guaranteed this amount, however; in Mexico, most people receive at least 15 days' wages.

Prevalence

Europe 

Mandatory
 Armenia: paid before the New Year holidays
 Greece: 14th-month and holiday bonuses are paid on Christmas, Easter, and summer vacation
 Italy: 13th-month bonus paid on Christmas to all workers, 14th-month bonus paid on June to retirees over the age of 64.
 Portugal: 13th-month paid in summer vacation and 14th-month at Christmas.
 Slovenia: mandatory 14th-month bonuses (deadline: July 1st, minimum amount: minimum gross salary). 
 Spain: mandatory 14th-month bonuses (pagas extraordinarias) paid in summer and at Christmas. They can be prorated into the twelve monthly salaries.

Customary
 Austria: End of June; a 14th-month bonus is paid at the end of November.
 Belgium: Paid at the end of the year; mandatory holiday bonus
 Croatia: Paid at Christmas or Easter
 Czech Republic, France, Luxembourg, Slovakia and Switzerland: Paid at the end of the year
 Czech Republic: The 13th month salary is not mandatory, but depending on the performance of the worker, employers will commonly offer it.
 Slovakia: 27% of all employees receive a Christmas bonus and 17% receive a 13th month salary. Some sectors are even paid more than the average 13th month salary: telecommunication companies, and banking and finance sectors.
 Finland: Paid in summer, usually 50 - 60 % of monthly salary
 Germany: Paid before Christmas
 Italy: A 14th-month bonus may be paid in June to those workers who qualify according to their national collective contract. The 13th month salary is called (gratifica natalizia) when it is awarded to factory or manual workers. Moreover, employees who have worked many years in the same company, managers, executives are usually offered a 14th month salary during the summer. Extra month salary like the 15th or 16th month salary, even if scarcer, can be offered in the petroleum and banking industries as well. 
 Netherlands: paid in November or December
 France: The 13th month salary is not written in the law, but it is a common practise, and employers cannot change their habits of offering it. It is received at the end of the year, at Christmas, or eventually in several payments. Generally, it is received in two times: a first payment in June and a second one in December. However, workers can also receive it quarterly or monthly. To calculate it, firms simply chose to give a month salary. Exceptions are made if the employee did not work during all the year in the company; in this case, the bonus is calculated in proportion to the number of hours. Some companies can apply some seniority conditions to the allocation of the 13th salary.
United Kingdom: There is no 13th month salary, but other bonuses exist.

Germany 
In Germany, a legal distinction is made between a thirteenth salary and a Christmas bonus; in most other countries, the terms are used interchangeably. The Christmas bonus (usually paid with the November salary) is intended to pay additional holiday expenses and retain employees. The thirteenth salary is paid by an employer for ongoing work at the end of a calendar year. An employee is entitled to a prorated thirteenth salary if they leave their employer before the end of the calendar year, unless the parties to the employment contract have agreed otherwise.

Special payments for regular work performance (a requirement fulfilled by the thirteenth salary, and the Christmas bonus in certain cases) can be counted towards the minimum wage. Their employment contract stipulates that they are entitled to a half-month Christmas bonus and an annual holiday payment, totaling one month's salary. To meet the minimum wage of €8.50 (required by law in Germany since January 2015), the employer consolidates the holiday payment and Christmas bonus and pays one-twelfth of the amount to the employee every month. The employee's hourly wage would increase to €8.69, meeting the minimum wage.

The Christmas bonus is part of the other-remuneration category, in accordance with §39b Abs. 3 of the EStG. The Christmas tax allowance was abolished with the Tax Reform Act of 25 July 1988. Since July 2008, federal officials have no longer received Christmas bonuses; the special payments (Christmas and holiday bonuses), amounting to five percent of the annual salary, were integrated into the officials' base salary.

Switzerland 
Most Swiss employers pay their employees' annual salary in 13 instalments, rather than 12. An employee usually receives two months' salary in December, which helps pay end-of-year and holiday bills. Sometimes they receive half in July and half in December, however, similar to Germany's Christmas bonus and holiday payment. The thirteenth monthly salary is not a bonus, but a delayed payment. Whether or not a thirteenth salary is paid is part of an employment contract; some companies pay a higher monthly salary instead of the additional payment. In the first and last years of employment, the thirteenth salary is prorated for partial years.

Some employers pay an additional annual bonus based on employee performance or employer profits. When an employee pays direct income tax and the 13th month's salary and bonus are paid in the same month, a higher tax rate is paid.

Latin America 
In Latin America, the thirteenth salary is commonly known as aguinaldo or prima in Spanish (bonus).

Mandatory
 Argentina: two equal instalments, by 30 June and 18 December
 Bolivia: tax-free, up to one month’s wages. A 14th-month bonus is mandatory as a holiday bonus if the GDP is over 4.5 percent.
 Brazil: paid in two equal parts, typically by 30 November and by 20 December. A mandatory 14th-month bonus is referred to as a "holiday bonus" and is paid in the subsequent month. It is one-twelfth of the wage paid in December per month worked previously, or equal to the December wage.
 Colombia: two halves, paid during the first 15 days of June and the first 20 days of December
 Costa Rica: paid during the first 20 days of December
 Dominican Republic, Mexico: paid by 20 December
 Ecuador: A mandatory 14th-month bonus is paid in parts or in a lump sum.
 El Salvador: Christmas bonus, based on years of service
 Guatemala: paid at mid-year. A mandatory 14th-month bonus is paid at the end of the year; both are equal to one month's salary.
 Honduras: paid in December. A mandatory 14th-month bonus is paid in July; both are equal to one month's salary.
 Nicaragua: one month's salary, paid by 10 December
 Panama: paid in three equal parts on 15 April, 15 August, and 15 December
 Peru: paid in July. A mandatory 14th-month bonus is paid in December.
 Uruguay: paid in two halves, on 30 June and by the end of the year
 Paraguay, Venezuela: paid at the end of the year

Customary
Chile: paid in December or in two halves, in September and December

Asia 

Mandatory
 India: paid within eight months of the end of the financial year
 Indonesia: religious-holiday bonus, paid at least one week before the holiday
 Philippines: the Labor Code states this bonus, commonly called “13th month”, must be paid in sum to permanent employees in December, or in two installments in May and November. Added 14th, 15th, and other bonuses may be given at the employer’s discretion.
 Saudi Arabia: paid on Eid al-Fitr

Customary
 China: paid during the month of the Lunar New Year or Spring Holiday.
 Hong Kong: paid at the Lunar New Year or the end of the year.
 Israel
 Japan: a summer bonus, paid in June. A 14th-month winter bonus is paid in December.
 Malaysia: paid at the end of the year
 Nepal: paid with the last month's salary before the festival of Dashain.
 Singapore (Annual Wage Supplement),.
 Taiwan: paid at the end of the year.
 United Arab Emirates: A 14th-month bonus is paid at the end of the year.
 Vietnam: paid the month before the Lunar New Year.

Africa 

 Angola: A mandatory vacation bonus is paid before a holiday. A mandatory 14th-month Christmas is paid in December.
 Nigeria: paid before Christmas
 South Africa: paid at the end of the year
 Mauritius: Paid in December

See also
 Bonus payment
 Christmas bonus (United Kingdom)
 Performance-related pay

References

Further reading
 
 A State Mandated Christmas Bonus from In Custodia Legis, the Law Library of Congress blog

Employee bonus